Claffey is an Irish surname. People surnamed Claffey include:

 Daniel Claffey (1869–1924), New Zealand cricketer
 Kieran Claffey (1949–1995), Irish Gaelic footballer
 Niall Claffey (born 1978), Irish hurler
 Úna Claffey (born 1947), Irish journalist and political adviser
 Vinny Claffey, Irish gaelic footballer (played until 2003)
 Gentleman Jack Gallagher, ring name of Oliver Claffey (born 1990), English wrestler